Fasoula may refer to:

Fasoula, Limassol, Cyprus
Fasoula, Paphos, Cyprus
Fasoula (surname)